Trichobaris trinotata, commonly known as the "Potato stalk borer", is a species of weevil in the family Curculionidae. It is found in North America where it is a pest of potato plants, the larvae tunnelling inside their stems.

Description
The rostrum or beak bends sharply downwards at the base. The insect is inconspicuous; it is black in color but appears gray as most of the surface is covered by minute gray scales; scales are absent from the head and from three spots at the base of the elytra, one at the front and one on either side, and these appear dark. These three bare spots give the insect its scientific name of "trinotata".

Ecology
This weevil feeds on plants in the family Solanaceae. The potato is its most economically-important food plant, but it sometimes feeds on the eggplant (Solanum melongena), the Carolina horsenettle (Solanum carolinense), the buffalo bur (Solanum rostratum), the European black nightshade (Solanum nigrum) and several species of groundcherry (Physalis).

Adults emerge from reproductive diapause in spring and the females start to lay their eggs in May. These are deposited singly in holes made in stems and leaf stalks by the insect's rostrum, or in the axils of terminal leaves. Having passed through five or six instars over a period of up to 106 days, the larvae pupate in the stem, with the adults emerging about twelve days later. There is a single generation each year and the adults overwinter inside the dead potato haulms or the stems of other members of the Solanaceae such as Solanum carolinense.

Few enemies of this weevil have been identified, but it is sometimes parasitised by the braconid wasp, Nealiolus curculionis and less frequently by the eurytomid wasp, Eurytoma tylodermatis.

Damage
The adults feed on leaves producing ragged holes, but it is the larvae that cause most damage to the potato crop with their tunnelling activities. At one time this weevil was considered a serious pest of potatoes, however modern management practices have reduced its impact. The burning or removal of crop residues destroys the overwintering adults.

References

 Poole, Robert W., and Patricia Gentili, eds. (1996). "Coleoptera". Nomina Insecta Nearctica: A Check List of the Insects of North America, vol. 1: Coleoptera, Strepsiptera, 41-820.

Further reading

 Arnett, R.H. Jr., M. C. Thomas, P. E. Skelley and J. H. Frank. (eds.). (2002). American Beetles, Volume II: Polyphaga: Scarabaeoidea through Curculionoidea. CRC Press LLC, Boca Raton, FL.
 
 Richard E. White. (1983). Peterson Field Guides: Beetles. Houghton Mifflin Company.

External links

 NCBI Taxonomy Browser, Trichobaris trinotata

Baridinae
Agricultural pest insects
Beetles described in 1831
Beetles of North America
Taxa named by Thomas Say